Gerry Crampton (28 April 1930 – 24 January 2009) was a British stunt performer and stunt coordinator best known for his work in the James Bond film series.

Early life
The eldest of five children, Robert Gerald Crampton, was born in Fulham on 28 April 1930. His father, a keen amateur boxer, taught Gerry and his brothers to box. He also became a keen swimmer and taught himself to dive.

Gerry left school at the age of 14 to become a butcher's boy before returning to London in 1945, initially finding work at Ealing Studios as a sound assistant on David Lean's Great Expectations (1946). In 1948 Crampton was called up for his National Service and found himself working as a teletypist in the RAF.

After Gerry began bodybuilding, winning Britain's Mr Body Beautiful in 1956.

Career
Crampton's big chance in films came when he met the James Bond stunt coordinator, Bob Simmons, in 1960, who took him under his wing.

Crampton had a special expertise working in India where he first worked on Tarzan Goes to India in 1962 with Jock Mahoney. He was to return to India 48 more times in his career, working on countless Indian as well as British productions.

Personal life
Crampton married for the first time when he was 20, but the marriage lasted less than a year. He remarried three more times, each ending in divorce, but in later years he was always proud to say that he remained on friendly terms with three of his ex-wives.

Filmography

References

External links

English stunt performers
British male film actors
1930 births
2009 deaths